Herbert Baverstock (January 1883 – 15 December 1951) was an English professional footballer who made over 360 appearances in the Football League for Bolton Wanderers. A full back, he made 388 appearances and scored four goals for the club.

Personal life 
Baverstock was married with two children and worked as an upholsterer. He served as a private in the Royal Flying Corps (latterly the Royal Air Force) during the First World War.

Career statistics

Honours 
Bolton Wanderers

 Football League Second Division: 1908–09
 Football League Second Division second-place promotion: 1910–11

References

1883 births
1951 deaths
Sportspeople from Dudley
English footballers
Association football fullbacks
Brierley Hill Alliance F.C. players
Bolton Wanderers F.C. players
Blackpool F.C. players
English Football League players
Royal Flying Corps soldiers
British Army personnel of World War I
Royal Air Force personnel of World War I
Upholsterers
Royal Air Force airmen